Wierzchlas may refer to:

Wierzchlas, Kuyavian-Pomeranian Voivodeship (north-central Poland)
Wierzchlas, Łódź Voivodeship (central Poland)
Wierzchlas, West Pomeranian Voivodeship (north-west Poland)